Pilcomayo may refer to :

 Pilcomayo River, (Quechua Pillku Mayu
 Pilcomayo Department, Argentina
 Apostolic Vicariate of Pilcomayo, a pre-diocesan Catholic missionary jurisdiction in Paraguay
 Pilcomayo District, Peru
  a gunboat of the Peruvian and Chilean navies.